The Victory Bell is the traveling trophy given to the winner of the annual football game between the Duke University Blue Devils and the University of North Carolina Tar Heels. The game was worth two points in the now-defunct, yearlong Carlyle Cup between the two schools.

History 
North Carolina and Duke first met in football in 1888, and the series has been renewed annually since 1922.

In the fall of 1948, UNC Head Cheerleader Norman Sper along with Loring Jones of Duke, likely inspired by other traveling trophies in college football, came up with the idea for the Victory Bell. Jones designed the frame and Sper obtained an old railway bell from the Southern Railway. North Carolina won possession of the first-ever Victory Bell game with a 20–0 shutout victory at Kenan Memorial Stadium in 1948.

At one time, the series was every bit as heated as the basketball rivalry between the two schools.  But in the 40 years from 1970 to 2009, Duke only managed 7 wins, including a series record streak of 13 consecutive Carolina wins from 1990 through 2002. 

However, this rivalry has been revived in recent years as Duke has again become competitive in the rivalry, with both teams having won five games each from 2010 through 2019.  

Duke victories in the 2012 and 2013 games marked the first time Duke had won consecutive games in the series since winning three straight from 1987 to 1989.  

After consecutive North Carolina victories in 2014 and 2015, Duke matched its longest winning streak in the last 30 years with wins in 2016, 2017 and 2018. 

This streak for Duke was broken on October 26, 2019 as Carolina clinched a 20–17 victory when Chazz Surratt picked off Deon Jackson’s trick-play pass at the goal line with 14 seconds left.  

With Carolina's 38-7 victory on October 2, 2021, Carolina again has posted three consecutive victories in the series.

Traditions

It has been a tradition as of late for the winner to spray-paint the platform of the trophy to match their school colors--Carolina blue for North Carolina and royal blue for Duke. After losing the Victory Bell in 2003, North Carolina came back the next year and beat Duke 40–17 in Duke's Wallace Wade Stadium. After the conclusion of the game, North Carolina football players immediately spray-painted the platform Carolina blue, leaving large amounts of Carolina blue paint residue on the track of the stadium. Whenever North Carolina has been in possession of the Victory Bell, cheerleaders wheel it out while ringing the bell at the same time the live ram mascot, Rameses, is brought out onto the field. The bell is also displayed in front of the students' section.

Game results
While the two schools agree that North Carolina leads the series, they do not agree on the overall record. North Carolina claims an all-time lead of 62–40–4; Duke claims North Carolina leads 59–39–4. The dispute centers around an 1889 game in which both North Carolina and Trinity stayed home because they believed they were the home team.  As a result, both schools claim the game as a win by forfeit, 1–0. Most neutral recordkeepers credit the game to North Carolina.

Both schools agree that North Carolina vacated its wins in 2008 and 2009.  Both schools also agree that North Carolina leads the series since the introduction of the Victory Bell with a record of 48–25–1, with two vacated North Carolina wins.

Note: Duke was known as Trinity College until 1924.

See also 
 List of NCAA college football rivalry games
 List of most-played college football series in NCAA Division I

References

College football rivalry trophies in the United States 
Duke Blue Devils football
North Carolina Tar Heels football
University of North Carolina at Chapel Hill rivalries